Khalif Diouf (born 24 March 1958) is a Senegalese judoka. He competed at the 1984 Summer Olympics and the 1992 Summer Olympics.

References

1958 births
Living people
Senegalese male judoka
Olympic judoka of Senegal
Judoka at the 1984 Summer Olympics
Judoka at the 1992 Summer Olympics
Place of birth missing (living people)